Malte Karbstein (born 30 January 1998) is a German professional footballer who plays as a centre-back for Waldhof Mannheim.

Career
Born in Neuruppin, Karbstein played in the youth teams of local side MSV Neuruppin before joining Energie Cottbus in 2011. He played 65 matches for the Energie Cottbus youth teams.

Starting with the 2015–16 season, he trained with Energie Cottbus' first team making 2 appearances in the 3. Liga. Over the following two seasons, he played 33 matches in the Regionalliga Nord. After the club's promotion to the 3. Liga, he made the squad for the first five matches but did not feature while appearing once in the regional cup competition.

In August 2018, Karbstein joined SV Werder Bremen II for an undisclosed fee.

In June 2020, it was announced Karbstein would move to Kickers Offenbach for the 2020–21 season.

References

1998 births
Living people
Sportspeople from Neuruppin
Footballers from Brandenburg
German footballers
Association football central defenders
FC Energie Cottbus players
SV Werder Bremen II players
Kickers Offenbach players
SV Waldhof Mannheim players
3. Liga players
Regionalliga players
Oberliga (football) players